F-16 Rachanon is a Thai Muay Thai fighter.

Titles and achievements

 2011 Thailand 135 lbs Champion
 2011 Lumpinee Stadium 130 lbs Champion

Fight record

|-  style="background:#cfc;"
| 2019-06-06 || Win ||align=left| Krabuelek OrBorTor.Kampee || Rajadamnern Stadium || Bangkok, Thailand ||  KO || 3 ||
|-  style="background:#fbb;"
| 2019-04-22 || Loss ||align=left| Sudyod Por.Pantida || Rajadamnern Stadium || Bangkok, Thailand ||  Decision || 5 || 3:00
|-  style="background:#fbb;"
| 2017- || Loss||align=left| Christian || Max Muay Thai  || Pattaya, Thailand || Decision || 3 || 3:00
|-  style="background:#cfc;"
| 2015-12-03 || Win ||align=left| Carlos Sitmonchai || Rajadamnern Stadium || Bangkok, Thailand || KO || 1 ||
|-  style="background:#fbb;"
| 2015-05-24 || Loss ||align=left| Pawel Jedrzejczyk || Max Muay Thai  || Pattaya, Thailand || Decision || 3 || 3:00
|-  style="background:#fbb;"
| 2012-09-07 || Loss ||align=left| Capitan Petchyindee Academy || Lumpinee Stadium || Bangkok, Thailand || TKO || 5 ||
|-  style="background:#fbb;"
| 2012-07-31 || Loss ||align=left| Capitan Petchyindee Academy || Lumpinee Stadium || Bangkok, Thailand || KO (High Kick)|| 3 ||
|-  style="background:#fbb;"
| 2012-03-12 ||Loss ||align=left| Nong-O Gaiyanghadao || Rajadamnern Stadium || Bangkok, Thailand || Decision || 5 || 3:00
|-  style="background:#fbb;"
| 2012-02- ||Loss ||align=left| Yodtuantong PetchyindeeAcademy ||  || Bangkok, Thailand || Decision || 5 || 3:00
|-  style="background:#cfc;"
| 2012-01- ||Win ||align=left| Yodtuantong PetchyindeeAcademy ||  || Bangkok, Thailand || Decision || 5 || 3:00
|-  style="background:#fbb;"
| 2011-12-09 || Loss||align=left| Singdam Kiatmuu9 || Lumpinee Stadium || Bangkok, Thailand || TKO (kicks) || 4 || 3:00
|-
! style=background:white colspan=9 |
|-  style="background:#cfc;"
| 2011-10-07 ||Win||align=left| Nong-O Gaiyanghadao || Lumpinee Stadium || Bangkok, Thailand || Decision || 5 || 3:00
|-  style="background:#cfc;"
| 2011-09-06|| Win||align=left| Kongsak P.K. Saenchai Muaythaigym || Lumpinee Stadium || Bangkok, Thailand || Decision || 5 || 3:00 
|-
! style=background:white colspan=9 |
|-  style="background:#fbb;"
| 2011-08-02|| Loss||align=left| Kongsak P.K. Saenchai Muaythaigym || Lumpinee Stadium || Bangkok, Thailand || Decision || 5 || 3:00
|-  style="background:#cfc;"
| 2011-07-07 ||Win ||align=left| Nong-O Gaiyanghadao || Rajadamnern Stadium || Bangkok, Thailand || Decision || 5 || 3:00
|-  style="background:#cfc;"
| 2011-05-26 ||Win ||align=left| Traijak Sitjomtrai || Rajadamnern Stadium || Bangkok, Thailand || Decision || 5 || 3:00
|-  style="background:#cfc;"
| 2011-05|| Win||align=left| Tuakatatong Phetpayatai || Lumpinee Stadium || Bangkok, Thailand || Decision || 5 || 3:00
|-  style="background:#cfc;"
| 2011-04|| Win||align=left| Arunchai Kiatpataraphan || Lumpinee Stadium || Bangkok, Thailand || Decision || 5 || 3:00
|-  style="background:#cfc;"
| 2011-03-01|| Win||align=left| Arunchai Kiatpataraphan || Lumpinee Stadium || Bangkok, Thailand || Decision || 5 || 3:00 
|-
! style=background:white colspan=9 |
|-  style="background:#fbb;"
| 2011-02|| Loss ||align=left| Parnpetch Chor Na Patalung ||  || Bangkok, Thailand || Decision || 5 || 3:00
|-  style="background:#cfc;"
| 2010-12-06 || Win ||align=left| Petchtanong Phetfergus || Lumpinee Stadium || Bangkok, Thailand || Decision || 5 || 3:00
|-  style="background:#cfc;"
| 2010-11-03 || Win ||align=left| Petchtanong Phetfergus || Lumpinee Stadium || Bangkok, Thailand || Decision || 5 || 3:00
|-  style="background:#fbb;"
| 2010-09-09|| Loss ||align=left| Arunchai Kiatpataraphan || Rajadamnern Stadium || Bangkok, Thailand || Decision || 5 || 3:00
|-  style="background:#fbb;"
| 2010-07-13 || Loss ||align=left| Wuttidet Lukprabat || Ruamnamjai Wongkarnmuay Fight, Lumpinee Stadium || Bangkok, Thailand || Decision || 5 || 3:00
|-  style="background:#cfc;"
| 2010- ||Win ||align=left| Traijak Sitjomtrai ||  || Bangkok, Thailand || Decision || 5 || 3:00
|-  style="background:#cfc;"
| 2010-02-16 || Win ||align=left| Lerdsila Chumpairtour || Por.Pramook Fight, Lumpinee Stadium || Bangkok, Thailand || Decision || 5 || 3:00
|-  style="background:#fbb;"
| 2009-12-29 ||Loss ||align=left| Pornsanae Sitmonchai || Lumpinee Stadium || Bangkok, Thailand || TKO || 3 ||
|-  style="background:#cfc;"
| 2009-12-04 || Win||align=left| Werayuth Loogpetnoi || Lumpinee Stadium || Bangkok, Thailand || Decision || 5 || 3:00
|-  style="background:#fbb;"
| 2009-10-30 || Loss ||align=left| Pettaksin Sor Thumpet ||  Lumpinee Stadium || Bangkok, Thailand || Decision || 5 || 3:00
|-  style="background:#cfc;"
| 2009-08-18 || Win ||align=left| Sitthichai Sitsongpeenong || Paianun Fight, Lumpinee Stadium || Bangkok, Thailand || Decision || 5 || 3:00
|-  style="background:#cfc;"
| 2009-07-24 || Win||align=left| Yodchat Fairtex || Lumpinee Stadium|| Bangkok, Thailand || Decision || 5 || 3:00
|-  style="background:#cfc;"
| 2009-07-01 || Win||align=left| Worachart Or Nuangjamnong || || Bangkok, Thailand || Decision || 5 || 3:00
|-  style="background:#fbb;"
| 2009-03-31 || Loss ||align=left| Pettaksin Sor Thumpet ||  Lumpinee Stadium || Bangkok, Thailand || Decision || 5 || 3:00
|-  style="background:#cfc;"
| 2009-02-06 || Win ||align=left| Fahmongkon Kor Chaipayom || || Bangkok, Thailand || Decision || 5 || 3:00
|-  style="background:#c5d2ea;"
| 2009-01-06 || Draw||align=left| Fahmongkon Kor Chaipayom || || Bangkok, Thailand || Decision || 5 || 3:00
|-  bgcolor="#cfc"
| 2008-03-20 || Win ||align=left| Masahiro Yamamoto || AJKF: Kick On! || Tokyo, Japan || TKO (cut) || 4 || 0:19 
|-
| colspan=9 | Legend:

References

F-16 Rachanon
Living people
1991 births